The Etymological Dictionary of Slavic Languages: Proto-Slavic Lexical Stock (abbreviated ESSJa / ) is an etymological dictionary of the reconstructed Proto-Slavic lexicon. It has been continuously published since 1974 until present, in 43 volumes, making it one of the most comprehensive in the world.

History
The dictionary was conceived in the 1950s with the inadequacy of the existing Slavic etymological dictionaries in mind. Since 1961 the preparations began for the dictionary under the direction of Oleg Trubachev at the Russian Language Institute of the Russian Academy of Sciences in the USSR. In 1963 a trial edition of the dictionary was published. Since its inception, the dictionary has been published by the Department of Etymology and Onomastics of the Russian Language Institute.

The Editor-In-Chief in the period 1974—2002 was Oleg Trubachev, and since 2002 Anatoly Zhuravlev.

The dictionary
For every Proto-Slavic reconstruction an etymology is given, as well as the history of etymological research. Reflexes in all Slavic languages are listed, and so are the cognates in other Indo-European languages. Proto-Slavic accent and accentual paradigm is not reconstructed. Elements of Proto-Slavic morphology (affixes, desinences) are also not reconstructed. Over 2100 journals and books have been used while writing the published volumes of the dictionary.

List of volumes

References

Further reading 
 Этимологический словарь славянских языков: (Праславянский лексический фонд): Проспект. Пробные статьи / Сост. О. Н. Трубачёв; Институт русского языка АН СССР. — М.: Изд-во АН СССР, 1963. — 96 с. — 2000 экз. (обл.)
 Варбот Ж. Ж. Морфонологическая проблематика в «Этимологическом словаре славянских языков» // Русский язык: Проблемы художественной речи, лексикологии и лексикографии. Виноградовские чтения IX—X. / Редкол.: Н. Ю. Шведова (отв. ред.) и др. — М.: Наука, 1981. — С. 188—189. — 200 с.
 Варбот Ж. Ж. «Этимологический словарь славянских языков. Праславянский лексический фонд»: проект, реализация, проблемы (К 85-летию со дня рождения академика О. Н. Трубачева) = Varbot Zh. Zh. “Etymological Dictionary of Slavic Languages. Proto-Slavic Lexical Stock”: the Project, the Outcome, the Issues (On the 85th Birthday of Academician O.N. Trubachev) // Известия Российской академии наук. Серия литературы и языка. — 2016. — Том 75, № 3 (май—июнь). — С. 51—55. — ISSN 0321-1711
 Журавлёв А. Ф. К уточнению представлений о славянских изоглоссах. Часть I. [*a če — *golo̧bȩ]: дополнения к лексическим материалам «Этимологического словаря славянских языков» / АН СССР, ин-т русского языка. — М.: [s.n.] , 1990. — 76 с. — (Предварительные публикации Института русского языка АН СССР.). — 
 Журавлёв А. Ф. К уточнению представлений о славянских изоглоссах. Часть II. [*golobica — *kotьlьnica]: дополнения к лексическим материалам «Этимологического словаря славянских языков» / АН СССР, ин-т русского языка. — М.: [s.n.] , 1990. — 70 с. — (Предварительные публикации Института русского языка АН СССР.). — 
 Журавлёв А. Ф. Заметки на полях «Этимологического словаря славянских языков» // Этимология. 1988—1990: Сб. статей. / Ин-т рус. яз. РАН; Отв. ред. О. Н. Трубачёв. — М.: Наука, 1993. — С. 77—88. — 204 с. — 
 Журавлёв А. Ф. Заметки на полях «Этимологического словаря славянских языков». II // Adfontes verborum. Исследования по этимологии и исторической семантике. К 70-летию Жанны Жановны Варбот. / редкол: А. Ф. Журавлёв, Ю. М. Гизатуллина, В. Н. Субботина, Г. И. Урбанович, А. В. Хелемендик. — М.: Индрик, 2006. — С. 140—147. —480 с. — 
 Калашников А. А. Заметки на полях 26 выпуска «Этимологического словаря славянских языков» // Этимология. 2006—2008 / Ин-т рус. яз. РАН; Отв. ред. Ж. Ж. Варбот. — М.: Наука, 2010. — С. 112—114. — 356 с. — 
 Копечный Фр. О новых этимологических словарях славянских языков // Вопросы языкознания. — 1976. — № 1. — С. 3—15.
 Kurkina L. Словенская лексика в «Этимологическом словаре славянских языков» (вып. 1—39—, М., 1974—2014—) // 34 Simpozij Obdobja 2015: Slovnica in slovar — aktualni jezikovni opis. Dio 1 / [Ur. Mojca Smolej]. — Ljubljana: Filozofska fakulteta, Oddelek za slovenistiko, Center za slovenščino kot drugi/tuji jezik, 2015. — S. 425—431. — 431 str. — 
 Крысько В. Б. Маргиналии к «Этимологическому словарю славянских языков» (вып. 34-38) // Вопросы языкознания. — 2014. — № 1. — С. 100—119. — 
 Орёл В. Э. К реконструкции праславянского словарного состава // Советское славяноведение. — 1987. — № 5. — С. 79—79. — 
 Орёл В. Э. [Рец на кн.:] Этимологический словарь славянских языков. Праславянский лексический фонд. Вып. 13 (*kroměžirъ — *kyžiti). М., 1987. 285 с. // Советское славяноведение. — 1988. — № 1. — С. 104—106. — 
 Орёл В. Э. [Рец на кн.:] Этимологический словарь славянских языков. Праславянский лексический фонд. Вып. 14 (*labati — *lěteplъjь). М., 1987. 268 с. // Советское славяноведение. — 1988. — № 2. — С. 110—111. — 
 Орёл В. Э. [Рец на кн.:] Этимологический словарь славянских языков. Праславянский лексический фонд. Вып. 15 (*lětina — *lokač). М., 1988. // Советское славяноведение. — 1989. — № 5. — С. 102—103. — 
 Орёл В. Э. Двадцатилетие «Этимологического словаря славянских языков» (вып. 1—21, 1974—1994) // Этимология. 1994—1996. / Ин-т рус. яз. РАН; Отв. ред. О. Н. Трубачёв. — М.: Наука, 1997. — С. 3—9. — 222, [2] с. — 
 Трубачёв О. Н. Из воспоминаний (посвящается 25-летию начала публикации Этимологического словаря славянских языков (ЭССЯ): 1974—1999 гг.)  // Русский язык в научном освещении. — 2001. — № 1. — С. 264—269. — 
 Трубачёв О. Н. Опыт ЭССЯ: к 30-летию с начала публикации (1974—2003) // Вопросы языкознания. — 2002. — № 4. — С. 3—24. — 
 Трубачёв О. Н. Работа над этимологическим словарем славянских языков // Вопросы языкознания. — 1967. — № 4. — С. 34—45.
 Трубачёв О. Н. Славяне: язык и история — как основа этногенеза: К 20-летию издания «Этимологический словарь славянских языков: Праславянский лексический фонд» (1974—1994), I—XX, А—М // Jужнословенски филолог. — књ. LI. — Београд, 1995. — С. 291—304. — 
 Трубачёв О. Н. Этимологический словарь славянских языков и праславянский словарь (опыт параллельного чтения) // Этимология. 1976. / Ин-т рус. яз. АН СССР; Отв. ред. О. Н. Трубачёв. — М.: Наука, 1978. — С. 3—17. — 184 с.
 Хэмп Э. П. Читая «Этимологический словарь славянских языков», вып. 17,18: расширения* medъ: * medovarъ, *medo- / Пер. с англ. О. Н. Трубачев // Этимология. 1994—1996. / Ин-т рус. яз. РАН; Отв. ред. О. Н. Трубачёв. — М.: Наука, 1997. — С. 73—74. — 222, [2] с. —

External links 
 Etymological dictionary of Slavic languages. Proto-Slavic lexical stock  // http://etymolog.ruslang.ru/
 Etymological dictionary of Slavic languages. Proto-Slavic lexical stock  // ftp://www.istorichka.ru/

Etymological dictionaries